WIM (WAP Identity Module or Wireless Identification Module) is a module that is part of a wireless device. It is based on the WAP 1.2 specification enabling secure transactions and non-repudiation based on a digital signature. It is used in handling device information.

Mobile telecommunications standards